The Juan River, also known as Baiguo River, Yisu River and Xingle River, is a left-bank tributary in the middle reaches of the Xiang River in Hunan, China. 

The river rises in the Changshan Mountains of Shuangfeng County, and its main stream runs generally southwest to northeast through Shuangfeng, Hengshan and Xiangtan counties, joining the Xiang at Yisuhe of Xiangtan.

References

Rivers of Hunan